Cornelis Simon Meijer (17 August 1904, Pieterburen – 12 April 1974) was a Dutch mathematician at the University of Groningen who introduced the Meijer G-function, a very general function that includes most of the elementary and higher mathematical functions as special cases; he also introduced generalizations of the Laplace transform that are referred to as Meijer transforms.

References

External links

1904 births
1974 deaths
People from De Marne
University of Groningen alumni
Academic staff of the University of Groningen
20th-century Dutch mathematicians